Oskar Johansson (born 27 December 1990) is a Swedish footballer who plays for Karlslunds IF as a defender.

References

External links

Fotbolltransfers profile

1990 births
Living people
Association football defenders
Swedish footballers
Allsvenskan players
Örebro SK players
Karlslunds IF players